Mihály Dávid (31 July 1886 – 3 April 1945) was a Hungarian athlete who competed mainly in the shot put. He was born in the village of Porkerec, now Purcărete, part of Negrilești, Bistrița-Năsăud, Romania. He competed for Hungary in the 1906 Intercalated Games held in Athens in the shot put where he won the silver medal. He died in Budapest in 1945.

References

External links
 

1886 births
1945 deaths
People from Bistrița-Năsăud County
Hungarian male shot putters
Medalists at the 1906 Intercalated Games
Athletes (track and field) at the 1906 Intercalated Games
20th-century Hungarian people